Nighthawks is a 1978 narrative film by Ron Peck. It follows the day-to-day life of a gay man in London.

Plot 
The film realistically portrays day-to-day gay life in London at the time. It shows a gay man, played by Ken Robertson, teaching geography during the day and going to gay pubs at night. His students ultimately challenge him with questions as to whether he is bent/queer. He responds that he is and answers their questions about his homosexuality calmly.

Cast
 Ken Robertson as Jim
 Tony Westrope as Mike
 Rachel Nicholas James as Judy
 Maureen Dolan as Pat
 Stuart Turton as Neal (as Stuart Craig Turton)
 Clive Peters as Peter
 Robert Merrick as John
 Frank Dilbert as American
 Peter Radmall as Artist
 Ernest Brightmore as Headmaster
 Jon Lindsay billed as Jon Angel as the Hustler

Reception 
In 1979, Janet Maslin of the New York Times found the (fictional) film documentary-realistic. She found it a "vivid" picture of an "intriguing and well-played" character, and qualified that by finding parts of the film "overlong and aimless."

References 

British LGBT-related films
1978 LGBT-related films
LGBT-related drama films
1978 films
1978 drama films
1970s British films